Norbert Georg Kuchinke (5 May 1940 – 3 December 2013) was a German journalist and actor.

Born in Schwarzwaldau, Silesia, Germany (now Czarny Bór, Poland), until 1956, he studied at a Russian speaking school and mastered the language. From 1973, Kuchinke was the first correspondent of Der Spiegel (Hamburg, West Germany) and Stern in Moscow, Soviet Union.

Apart from journalism, he was an actor, appearing in five films through 1979 to 2008, most commonly playing foreign roles. His most noted role was as Bill Hansen, a Danish professor in the Soviet comedy-drama Autumn Marathon.

Norbert Kuchinke died following a long illness on 3 December 2013, aged 73, at a hospital in Berlin, Germany.

Filmography

References

External links

1940 births
2013 deaths
Deaths from leukemia
Deaths from cancer in Germany
People from Wałbrzych County
People from the Province of Silesia
German journalists
German male journalists
German male film actors
German expatriates in Russia
20th-century German male actors
21st-century German male actors
German male writers